People's Welfare Party may refer to:

People's Welfare Party (Malaysia), Parti Kesejahteraan Insan Tanah Air (KITA)
 People's Welfare Party (PBG) in Granada (Parliament of Andalusia constituency)